The Moonstone is a daytime drama series produced by King Bert Productions for BBC One. It is an adaptation of the Wilkie Collins 1868 novel of the same name described by T.S. Eliot as the first and greatest of English detective novels. It stars Joshua Silver and John Thomson.

Plot
Rachel Verinder, a young English woman, inherits a large Indian diamond on her eighteenth birthday. It is a legacy from her uncle, a corrupt British army officer who served in India. The diamond is of great religious significance as well as being extremely valuable, and three Hindu priests have dedicated their lives to recovering it. Rachel's eighteenth birthday is celebrated with a large party, at which the guests include her cousin Franklin Blake. She wears the Moonstone on her dress that evening for all to see, including some Indian jugglers who have called at the house. Later that night, the diamond is stolen from Rachel's bedroom, and a period of turmoil, unhappiness, misunderstandings and ill-luck ensues in a complex plot to explain the theft, identify the thief, trace the stone and recover it.

Cast and characters
David Calder as Mr Bruff
Stewart Clarke as Godfrey Ablewhite
Terenia Edwards as Rachel Verinder
Sarah Hadland as Miss Clack
Joshua Silver as Franklin Blake
John Thomson as Detective Sergeant Cuff
Leo Wringer as Gabriel Betteredge
Nisa Cole as Penelope Betteredge
Sophie Ward as Lady Verinder
Guy Henry as Mr Murthwaite
Jane McGrath as Roseanna Spearman
Sophie Stone as Lucy Yolland
Jeremy Swift as Dr Candy
Simon Schatzberger as Septimus Luker
Trevor Fox as Dr Ezra Jennings
Jag Sanghera as Guardian

Episodes

References

External links
 
 

2010s British drama television series
2016 British television series debuts
2016 British television series endings
Films based on works by Wilkie Collins
BBC high definition shows
BBC television dramas
English-language television shows
2010s British television miniseries
2010s British mystery television series
BBC Daytime television series